Ognjanci is a village in the municipality of Petrovec, North Macedonia.

Demographics
According to the 2002 census, the village had a total of 1142 inhabitants. Ethnic groups in the village include:
Albanians 543
Macedonians 317
Serbs 256
Turks 8
Romani 12
Bosniaks 2
Others 4

References

External links

Villages in Petrovec Municipality
Albanian communities in North Macedonia